Vidyasagar Teachers' Training College, Kalna (VTTC), also known as  Kalna B.Ed College, is a B.Ed college situated in Kalna, West Bengal.

It was established in 2008. The college, under West Bengal University of Teachers' Training, Education Planning and Administration, is also approved by the National Council for Teacher Education (NCTE) and the  University Grants Commission (UGC).

See also
 List of teacher education schools in India

References

External links
 http://vidyasagarttcollege.org.in/ 

Colleges of education in India
Universities and colleges in Paschim Bardhaman district
Educational institutions established in 2008
2008 establishments in West Bengal